Three ships of the United States Navy have been named USS Juneau, after the city of Juneau, Alaska:

  was an Atlanta-class light cruiser commissioned February 1942 and sunk eight months later in the Naval Battle of Guadalcanal
 This "Juneau incident" is particularly notable for the loss of the five Sullivan brothers
  was a Juneau-class light cruiser, commissioned 1946, active in the Korean War, and scrapped in 1962
 , a USN light cruiser class, a modification of the Atlanta class
  was an amphibious transport dock, commissioned in 1969 and decommissioned in 2008

United States Navy ship names